August Louis "Augie" Wolf (born September 3, 1961) is an American former field athlete known for throwing the shot put. He is a graduate of Princeton University. He is a former United States indoor shot put national champion, United States outdoor shot put national champion, and an Olympian. A member of the Republican Party, he sought the Republican nomination for the U.S. Senate for Connecticut in 2016 against Democratic incumbent Richard Blumenthal. He was defeated at the state Republican convention by state representative from Bethel, Dan Carter.

Career 
Wolf studied and trained at Princeton University from 1979 to 1983, becoming the record-holder in the Ivy League with a throw of 67-2. After training in Leverkusen, Germany, with TSV Bayer 04 he placed 2nd in the 1984 Olympic Trials, earning a spot on the American team at the 1984 Summer Olympics, placing fourth in the shot put competition. He was the 1984 United States National champion. Wolf placed fifth at the 1983 World University Games in Edmonton, Alberta, Canada.

During his athletic career, Wolf was involved in one drug testing violation. The International Association of Athletics Federations (IAAF) initially banned Wolf for life after ruling he had refused post-match testing on July 7, 1985, in Byrkjelo, Norway. Supported by the USA Track & Field Federation, he appealed citing errors in the testing notification. The ban was reduced to an eighteen-month suspension and he returned to competition in 1987.

Personal 
Wolf was raised in St. Paul, Minnesota, and is a 1983 graduate of Princeton University. He works for Lebenthal Wealth Advisors and is on the Board of Holborn.

He has four children. One son, A.J., born 1994, redshirted as a college football sophomore defensive tackle for the 2014 Duke Blue Devils. A.J. was a four-time New York State NYSAIS Champion in the shot put and discus, and a Junior National shot put champion. He was also a four-year letterman and two-time New York State Sportswriters Association (NYSSWA) All-State selection in football. Son Alexander was 2014 Gatorade Basketball Player of the Year in the State of Connecticut and will attended and play for Dartmouth College in 2014. Son Andrew will attend University of Connecticut in 2014. Daughter Abbie will be a junior at Greenwich High School.

Wolf founded and leads US Athletic Trust, a sport NGO providing support and advocacy for American Olympic athletes, and was named Trustee of the United States Olympic and Paralympic Foundation in 2014. After the series of U.S. Olympic scandals in 2018, he also cofounded Olympians Rising, a non-profit group of Olympians and friends supporting urgent reform to the U.S. Olympic Committee and rebuilding the U.S. Olympic program from the ground up. He is also on the Board of the Friends of Princeton Track.

Politics

Wolf sought to be the 2016 Republican candidate for Connecticut's U.S. Senate seat, currently held by Democrat Richard Blumenthal. He was defeated by state representative Dan Carter at the state Republican convention on May 9, securing less than the 15% of delegates required for an automatic primary. On May 11, Wolf announced that he would attempt to force a primary by collecting the signatures of 8,079 registered Republicans by June 7.

On October 19, 2015, billionaire, industrialist David Koch held a fundraiser for three Senators and August Wolf in his campaign for United States Senate against Blumenthal.

On June 1, 2016, The Hartford Courant reported that a former campaign staffer Samantha Menh filed a suit against the Campaign, August Wolf, and Campaign manager Baylor Myers, alleging breach of contract. The lawsuit also claimed Wolf violated federal and Connecticut campaign laws, and cited several unsubstantiated claims of untoward behavior. It was said by the attorney representing Baylor Myers that "we will present evidence that Ms. Menh had planned to quit her job with that previous employer and bring a false claim of sexual harassment to leverage a settlement. The allegations made in this lawsuit are false and we can prove it.”  On October 19, 2022, six and a half years after Ms. Menh had filed her original complaint, Ms. Menh voluntarily withdrew her complaint against Wolf, without any financial settlement. A jury trial had been scheduled on commence on November 1, 2022, less than two weeks later.

2016 Connecticut Republican State Convention

After gaining the support of over 17% of the delegates in the first round of voting (over the 15% hurdle for ballot access), Wolf's supporters were then aggressively lobbied by Super Delegates, and about 50 switched to Carter before the final tally. Upon failing to secure 15% of the delegates at the State Republican Convention, Wolf decided to petition onto the primary ballot.

He failed to gather the required signatures of 2% of registered Republican voters, 8,079, and the state Secretary of State verified just 5,280 signatures on June 21, 2016. August Wolf failed to force a primary with party endorsed candidate Dan Carter. He then suspended his campaign.

See also
 List of Princeton University Olympians

Notes

External links 
 
 
Biography at Ballotpedia
Issue positions and quotes at On the Issues

1961 births
Living people
American male shot putters
Athletes (track and field) at the 1984 Summer Olympics
Connecticut Republicans
Olympic track and field athletes of the United States
Princeton Tigers men's track and field athletes
Sportspeople from Saint Paul, Minnesota
Track and field athletes from Minnesota
Princeton School of Public and International Affairs alumni